Charles Garner may refer to:

 Charles Garner (footballer), English footballer
 Charles Garner (sailor) (1906–1966), American sailor
 Charles Garner, a pen name used by Kim Philby, a British journalist, intelligencer office, and double agent

See also

 Garner (surname)